Eduardo Ferrer Ríos (born November 28, 1973) is a Puerto Rican politician. He was elected to the Puerto Rico House of Representatives in the 2012 general election. Ferrer is the brother of former Representative and President of the PPD Héctor Ferrer.

Ferrer won a spot on the PPD ballot at the primaries earlier in 2012. He arrived in seventh place in the voting, and wouldn't have been elected. However, a scandal involving his own brother forced second place candidate Carmen Yulín Cruz to relinquish her ballot spot for Representative to run for Mayor of San Juan, allowing Eduardo to move into sixth place. Due to his brother's resignation from the House, Ferrer was sworn in on May 24, 2012 to fill his spot.

After being officially elected at the 2012 elections, Ferrer was appointed by his party to serve as Majority Whip of the Puerto Rico House of Representatives.

On July 1, 2013, he officially announced his resignation to the House of Representatives.

References

Living people
Popular Democratic Party members of the House of Representatives of Puerto Rico
1973 births